Intlo Ramayya Veedilo Krishnayya is a 1982 Indian Telugu-language film directed by debutant Kodi Rama Krishna and produced by K. Raghava starring Chiranjeevi, Madhavi and debutant Gollapudi Maruthi Rao.

Released on 22 April 1982, The film was huge success at the box office. The film was later remade in Tamil as Veetula Raman Veliyila Krishnan (1983), in Kannada as Maneli Ramanna Beedheeli Kamanna (1983) and in Hindi as Ghar Mein Ram Gali Mein Shyam (1988).

Synopsis
Rajasekharam (Chiranjeevi), a civil engineer, comes to a village and falls in love with Jayalaxmi (Madhavi). They get married and move to a city. The neighbor Subba Rao (Gollapudi Maruthi Rao) casts an evil eye on Jayalaxmi and creates problems in their life. How everything gets solved is seen in the rest of the film.

Cast
 Chiranjeevi as Rajasekharam
 Madhavi as Jayalaxmi
 Gollapudi Maruthi Rao as Subba Rao [debut as an actor]
 Poornima as Veerasathya Varaprasadha Manglala Durga Gnana prasoona Mangathayaru(Chitti thalli)
 Sangeeta
 Annapoorna
 P. L. Narayana
 Bheemeswara Rao as Dasaratha Ramayya
 Gaadiraju Subba Rao
 Hanuman Reddy
 Kakinada Shyamala
 Vijayalakshmi
 Jayasheela
 Girija Rani

Production
Kodi Ramakrishna, who earlier assisted Dasari Narayana Rao, made his directorial debut with this film. Initially, Kodi started a different project which he later shelved. Kodi took six months to complete the script. Kodi approached producer K. Raghava with a concept of a woman who is always suspicious her husband. Though Kodi had Chiranjeevi in mind for the lead role, Raghava insisted on Gollapudi playing Subbarao. Kodi had no choice but to agree. When he brought Chiru's name to the producer, he thought for a moment and replied that if Chiranjeevi agrees, he's fine with the choice. Chiranjeevi was initially reluctant to play the role as he wanted Chandramohan to play the character, he liked the script still had doubts whether the audience would accept him in such a soft role, Kodi convinced him to play the character. Kodi's choice was proven right after the film's success.

Most of the shooting was held in Palakollu and surroundings. Climax was shot in Chiranjeevi's house and also in Antervedipalem. The boat journey in the climax was shot on Antervedi, where River Godavari meets with the Bay of Bengal.

Soundtrack

All songs written by C. Narayana Reddy and composed by J. V. Raghavulu

Reception 
The film was a commercial success and had a 50-day run in 8 centres and 100-day run in two centres.

References

External links
 

1982 films
Films directed by Kodi Ramakrishna
Films scored by J. V. Raghavulu
Telugu films remade in other languages
1980s Telugu-language films
1982 directorial debut films